Jean-Baptiste-Denis Despré (24 June 1752 – 2 March 1832) was a French playwright, librettist, journalist, and translator.

Biography
Jean-Baptiste-Denis Despré was born in Dijon, Côte-d'Or. He was secretary of Louis Bonaparte, who made him a councillor of state. In 1783 at the Gaîté, he parodied plays of William Shakespeare, that was adapted by Jean-François Ducis.

Works 
1776: La Bonne femme, ou le Phénix (vaudeville, parody of Alceste), (with Pierre-Yves Barré (1749-1832) and Pierre-Antoine-Augustin de Piis (1755-1832))
1777: L'Opéra de province (parody of Armide in two acts and in verse)
1783: Le Roi Lu (parodie du Roi Lir ou Lear, in one act and in verse)
1792: Cécile et Ermancé (opéra comique)
1793: Nice (one-act comédie en vaudeville, in prose, imitation of Stratonice)
1796: Le Retour à Bruxelles (one-act opéra comique)
1796: La Succession (one-act opéra comique), (with Jacques-Marie Deschamps)
1797: Le Pari (divertissement in one acte, en prose et en vaudevilles), (with Pierre-Yves Barré, Jacques-Marie Deschamps, François-Georges Desfontaines (1733-1825), and Jean-Baptiste Radet (1752-1830)
1798: Le portrait de Fielding (one-act comedy)
1799: L'Allarmiste (comédie en vaudeville)
1800: Le gondolier, ou La soirée venitienne (one-act opera), (with Louis-Philippe de Ségur (1753-1830))
1803: Saül (oratorio mis en action)
1803: Le Poète satyrique (one-act comedy, in verse)
1803: Une soirée de deux prisonniers, ou Voltaire et Richelieu (one-act comedy)
1804: Le pavillon du Calife ou Almanzor et Zobéide (opera)
1805: Le Nouveau magasin des modernes (one-act comedy, in prose)
1805: La Prise de Jéricho (oratorio in three parts)
1814: Le laboureur chinois (one-act opera), (with Jacques-Marie Deschamps (1750?-1826), Étienne Morel de Chédeville (1751-1814) and Henri-Montan Berton (1767-1844))
1822: Mémoires sur Garrick et sur Macklin
1822: Mémoires sur Molière, et sur Mme Guérin, sa veuve (notes and commentary)
1827: Œuvres choisies de Dorat

Translations 
1793: Le moine by Matthew Lewis
1794: The Mysteries of Udolpho by Ann Radcliffe
1798: Camilla, ou La peinture de la jeunesse by Fanny Burney (1752–1840)
1821: Works by Horace
1825–1827: Histoire d'Angleterre depuis l'invasion de Jules-César jusqu'à la révolution de 1688 by David Hume
1826: A Simple Story, by Elizabeth Inchbald (1753-1821)

References

External links 
 Jean-Baptiste-Denis Despré on IdRef

1752 births
Writers from Dijon
1832 deaths
English–French translators
French publishers (people)
18th-century French journalists
19th-century French journalists
French male journalists
18th-century French dramatists and playwrights
19th-century French dramatists and playwrights
French opera librettists
19th-century French male writers
18th-century French male writers
19th-century French translators